Pontiolaelaps is a genus of mites in the family Digamasellidae. There are at least three described species in Pontiolaelaps.

Species
These three species belong to the genus Pontiolaelaps:
 Pontiolaelaps crenatus (Luxton, 1984)
 Pontiolaelaps salinus Luxton, 1989
 Pontiolaelaps terebratus (Luxton, 1984)

References

Acari